The Scottish and North Irish Yeomanry (SNIY) is a reserve Light Cavalry Regiment, formed in 2014, created out of the restructuring of the British Army's Territorial Army. It is operationally paired with The Royal Scots Dragoon Guards, (SCOTS DG) based at Leuchars Station in Fife. The Regiment has numerous squadrons across Scotland and Northern Ireland.

History

In July 2013, it was announced that the Royal Mercian and Lancastrian Yeomanry would be restructured under the Army 2020 plan.  Consequently, on 31 October 2014, the new regiment was formed from the Regimental Headquarters (RHQ) of the Royal Mercian and Lancastrian Yeomanry along with three Squadrons of the Queen's Own Yeomanry.  This new regiment would also include the Lothians and Border Horse which was to re-raised shortly thereafter. As of October 2021, it consists of:

Regimental Headquarters, at Redford Barracks, Edinburgh
A (Ayrshire (Earl of Carrick's Own) Yeomanry) Squadron, in Ayr
B (North Irish Horse) Squadron, in Belfast and Coleraine
C (Fife and Forfar Yeomanry/Scottish Horse) Squadron, in Cupar
E (Lothians and Border Horse) Squadron, at Redford Barracks, Edinburgh — E Sqn acts as the Command and Support Squadron of the regiment.

The Regiment is paired with The Royal Scots Dragoon Guards in the Light Cavalry role under Strategic Defence and Security Review (SDSR) 2020. It is primarily equipped with the Jackal reconnaissance vehicle, recently converting from the RWIMIK platform.  Along with the Royal Scots Dragoon Guards, the regiment sits under control of 51st Infantry Brigade and Headquarters Scotland and is the only army reserve armoured unit in Scotland and Northern Ireland.

In 2018, the regiment was present with its first regimental guidon by HM Queen Elizabeth II.

Recruitment
The regiment recruits soldiers from around the following Scottish counties: Lanarkshire, Lothian, Angus, Scotland and Ayrshire as well as from Northern Ireland.

Lineage

Freedoms
The regiment has received the freedom of several locations throughout its history; these include:
  2 April 2022: Edinburgh ("E" Squadron).

References

External links
Website

Yeomanry regiments of the British Army
Military units and formations established in 2014
Irish regiments of the British Army
Royal Armoured Corps
Cavalry regiments of the British Army
2014 establishments in the United Kingdom